Chrionema is a genus of fish from the duckbill family Percophidae.

Species
The following species are members of Chrionema:

 Chrionema chlorotaenia McKay, 1971
 Chrionema chryseres Gilbert, 1905
 Chrionema furunoi Okamura & Yamachi, 1982
 Chrionema pallidum Parin, 1990
 Chrionema squamentum (Ginsburg, 1955)
 Chrionema squamiceps Gilbert, 1905

References

Percophidae